Cirrhochrista aurantialis is a moth in the family Crambidae. It is found on Ambon Island.

The wingspan is about 26 mm. The forewings are orange-yellow with silver markings. The base of the costa is streaked with silver and fuscous. The hindwings are white, but yellowish towards the outer margin.

References

Moths described in 1919
Spilomelinae
Moths of Indonesia